Henrieta Nagyová was the defending champion but lost in the first round to Silvija Talaja.

Julie Halard-Decugis won in the final 6–1, 6–2 against Fang Li.

Seeds
A champion seed is indicated in bold text while text in italics indicates the round in which that seed was eliminated.

  Henrieta Nagyová (first round)
  Julie Halard-Decugis (champion)
  Tamarine Tanasugarn (quarterfinals)
  Sylvia Plischke (first round)
  Fang Li (final)
  Anna Smashnova (first round)
  Olga Barabanschikova (quarterfinals)
  Shi-Ting Wang (quarterfinals)

Draw

External links
 1998 Volvo Women's Open Draw

Singles
Volvo Women's Open - Singles
 in women's tennis